Gneevebane is a townland in County Westmeath, Ireland. The townland is located near the border with County Offaly and is in the civil parish of Castlelost. The M6 Motorway runs through the south near the junction linking up with the R400 regional road. The R446 regional road cuts through the middle of the townland. The town of Rochfortbridge is to the east, with Tyrrellspass to the west.

References 

Townlands of County Westmeath